Drona is a small-arms range training simulator for imparting realistic and cost-effective simulator based weapons training. It was developed by Simulator Development Division based at Secunderabad city in India.

Simulator Development Division (SDD) was established as a nodal agency for development of simulators for Indian Army in the year 1991.

Drona is an electronic and software-based equipment which reduces expenditure on ammunition, logistics and time spent on regular troop training by 40 to 50 per cent.

Equipment comprises either a single-lane or multi-lane (usually eight) firing stations connected to an instructor server. Weapons such as 7.62 mm SLR, 7.62 mm LMG, 5.56 mm INSAS and 5.56 mm LMG can be used in the firing station. At the firing station, user is shown computer generated images, to simulate different kinds of terrain and conditions. Other options include day and night firing, right and left-handed use and bi-lingual instructions in English and Hindi. An instructor will sit in a sound-proof AC cabin to observe and guide the trainee.

References

See also
 Indian Army

Indian Army